Frank Philipp Albert (born 29 December 1966 in Schwerte, Germany) is a German real-estate entrepreneur and founder of Supernova-Group, of which he has been the chief executive since its founding.

Career
Frank Albert grew up in Menden, Sauerland in Germany and moved to Graz, Austria to train as an economics teacher after graduating from high school. He completed his studies in social and economic sciences at the University of Graz (German: Karl-Franzens-Universität) in 1994, graduating with a doctorate.

Albert gained his first professional experience by working at his parents' firm in the lighting industry. He became an assistant to the managing director of the Styria-based Joanneum Research organization for three years, after a number of trips abroad, before founding his own company in 1994. This company is known today as Supernova-Group and Albert has been its chief executive since its founding.

Supernova-Group focuses on the development and operation of specialized retail and shopping centers in a variety of countries in central Europe and has about 80 projects with annual rentals of approximately 100 million euros.

Frank Albert was awarded the Decoration of Honour for Services to the Republic of Austria (German: Grosses Ehrenzeichen für Verdienste um die Republik Österreich) for his business endeavors and socially oriented wind-down of Baumax AG in September 2018.

Decorations and awards
 2018: Decoration of Honour for Services to the Republic of Austria: Grand Decoration of Honour

Notes

External links
 For his CV check Curriculum Vitae

1966 births
Austrian company founders
Recipients of the Grand Decoration for Services to the Republic of Austria
Austrian businesspeople
Living people